170–176 John Street is a commercial building erected in 1840 facing Burling Slip (now filled in) on John Street along the East River in the Financial District of Lower Manhattan. It is one of a small number (possibly only two) of granite-faced Greek Revival buildings to have survived in New York City.

It was originally known as the Hickson W. Field building; later, it was used as a ship chandlery and known as the Baker, Carver & Morrell Building. It was listed on the National Register of Historic Places in 1971.

In 1982, the real estate developer Daniel W. Gerrity converted the building to residential use, adding a sixth story. The architects for the project were Buttrick White & Burtis.

See also
National Register of Historic Places listings in New York County, New York
List of New York City Designated Landmarks in Manhattan

References

Commercial buildings completed in 1840
Commercial buildings on the National Register of Historic Places in Manhattan
Financial District, Manhattan
Greek Revival architecture in New York City
New York City Designated Landmarks in Manhattan